The Signet Society of Harvard University was founded in 1870 by members of the class of 1871. The first president was Charles Joseph Bonaparte. It was, at first, dedicated to the production of literary work only, going so far as to exclude debate and even theatrical productions. According to The Harvard book It seemed to the founders that there was room in the College world for another association that should devote itself more exclusively to literary work than is possible with large numbers. Accordingly, they confined the membership to a few, and required that new members shall be, so far as possible, "representative men," and that at least five should be in the first half of their class.

After a few years in quarters on university property, the Signet moved to an off-campus location at 46 Dunster Street.

The Signet Society's mission

The Signet celebrates most of the arts, including music, the visual arts, and theater. Members are active in most undergraduate publications. Many undergraduate Signet members are in other Harvard College artistic and literary organizations, including the Harvard Advocate, the Hasty Pudding Theatricals, the Harvard Crimson, the Harvard Lampoon, the Harvard Radcliffe Orchestra, and the Harvard Radcliffe Dramatic Club. It admits both men and women without prejudice, unlike final clubs. Membership dues are required, but are pro-rated by Harvard's financial aid calculations, allowing all members of the college community to be considered for membership. Harvard faculty and administrators have been and are Signet officers, associates, and members.

The opening remarks of the Signet's minutes state: "On Tuesday evening, November 1, 1870, a meeting was held at 10 Grays Hall preliminary to the organization of a senior society, which was to afford to a select number a pleasant means of intercourse with each other, not to be expected from the illiberal policy of the only society of reputation existing." This "illiberal policy" refers to the displeasure with which the founders of the Signet greeted the established Final Clubs. These first members formed the society's admissions criteria to transcend the social politics that they perceived as dominating in the Final Club system. 
 
To distinguish the Signet from other exclusive organizations, the founding members stated in the original charter that members would be chosen according to "merit and accomplishment." Today, those membership criteria are still present in the club's constitution mandating that members "shall be chosen with regard to their intellectual, literary and artistic ability and achievements." While these criteria are central to the put-up process (admissions procedure), personal character is also considered.

Architecture

Architectural historian Douglass Shand-Tucci includes an in-depth discussion of Signet's building in his history of Harvard's campus, relating the oddity that a firm known for its preeminence in Gothic Revival was employed to renovate an 1820s Colonial residence (converted in 1880 to a Victorian clubhouse) into a neo-Federal structure with baroque details.  Regarding its distinctive features, Shand-Tucci writes:
It is in feeling wildly Baroque (of all things)—a welcome touch of flamboyance for what would otherwise have been a rather staid clubhouse for the Signet… the graphic quality of Cram & Goodhue’s and LaRose’s new frontispiece is actually rather reminiscent of book design (not to mention the Palladianism of several Tory Row mansions), and centers on a two story pedimented Ionic pavilion displaying the Signet arms…. The design concept- cavalier enough, but very successful—discloses another guise of history-making in Harvard architecture: to restore the house, not as it originally was, but in LaRose’s words, as it "ought to have been."  Thus the architectural solecism of the two orders of the porch—the Doric columns and Ionic pilasters—was retained.

Traditions
The emblem of the Signet was, at one time, "a signet-ring inclosing a nettle," the signet-ring symbolizing unity and the nettle symbolizing impartiality. The emblem which appears over the door of the Signet includes a beehive and bees, and a legend in Ancient Greek: μουσικήν ποίει και εργάζου -- "Create art, and live it." Another motto of the Society is attributed to Virgil: Sic vos non vobis Mellificatis apes -- "So do you bees make honey, not for yourselves." From this comes the Society's tradition of referring to its undergraduate members as "drones."

The Signet eschews initiation rituals common to Harvard's Final Clubs and the Lampoon in favor of an induction, during which each new member receives a red rose.  The rose is to be kept, dried, and returned to the Signet Society upon the publication of the member's first substantial published work. The Signet maintains a library of these works, which were originally literary, but now include programs or other artifacts marking the performance of music, films, or displays of the visual artistry of members.

Dried roses hang on the walls of the Signet nearby the works that occasioned their return.  Particularly noteworthy is T.S. Eliot's rose, which hangs along with his original letter of acceptance to the society.

Since 1910, the Signet has hosted an Annual Dinner honoring poets, authors, musicians, and social commentators. The Signet has a longstanding, reciprocal relationship with the Elizabethan Club, (or "The Lizzie") of Yale University. The two organizations sporadically hold a lawn croquet tournament, for which a handled and engraved silver pudding cup in a mahogany case serves as the trophy.

An alumni corporation administers the Signet's endowment, property, and staff.  Since 2010, the Society has hosted Artists-in-Residence in a second-floor apartment.

Some notable members

Arts and letters
 James Agee, novelist, screenwriter, poet, author 
 Conrad Aiken, author
 John Ashbery, poet, writer 
 John Berendt, writer
 Derek Bok, Harvard President
 Andy Borowitz, writer, comedian, actor
 Leonard Bernstein, composer and conductor
 Earl Derr Biggers, novelist and playwright
 T. S. Eliot, poet, author
 Robert Frost, poet
 Peter J. Gomes, preacher, theologian
 Donald Hall, poet
 Mason Hammond, Classics scholar
 Seamus Heaney, poet
 Abbott Lawrence Lowell, Harvard President, historian
 Norman Mailer, writer
 Samuel Eliot Morison, author, educator, maritime historian, retired Rear Admiral
 Charles Eliot Norton, scholar
 Arthur Stanwood Pier, author
 George Plimpton, writer, journalist
 Neil Rudenstine, Harvard President
 George Santayana, philosopher, poet, novelist
 Arthur Schlesinger, Jr., historian
 Andrew Sullivan, writer, journalist
 Wallace Stevens, poet
 John Updike, writer
 John Hall Wheelock, poet

Journalism
 Jill Abramson, executive editor, New York Times
 Adam Gopnik, writer, The New Yorker
 Hendrick Hertzberg, senior editor, The New Yorker
 Walter Isaacson, journalist, author
 Joseph Lelyveld, journalist, author
 Frank Rich, critic, writer
 Reihan Salam
 Alessandra Stanley, critic, writer
 Richard Tofel, journalist, author
 Fareed Zakaria, editor, author, commentator
 Marella Gayla, journalist, pasta maker

Media and entertainment
 Amy Brenneman, actress
 Nicholas Britell, film composer and producer
 Tommy Lee Jones, actor
 Rashida Jones, actress
 John Lithgow, actor
 Donal Logue, actor
 James Murdoch, media owner
 Conan O'Brien, talk show host
 Natalie Portman, actress
 James "Toofer" Spurlock, fictional character on television show 30 Rock
 Whit Stillman, writer-director
 Tom Werner, producer, Red Sox co-owner
 Alan "Scooter" Zackheim, reality show winner Beauty and the Geek

Sciences
 James B. Conant, Harvard President, scholar, chemist
 Charles W. Eliot, Harvard President, chemist, mathematician
 Owen Gingerich, astronomer
 William James, psychologist and philosopher 
 Thomas Kuhn, philosopher
 Andrew Weil, author, physician, established field of integrative medicine

Government, diplomacy, and national security
 Theodore Roosevelt, 26th President of the United States 
 Franklin D. Roosevelt, 32nd President of the United States
 Benazir Bhutto, late Prime Minister of Pakistan
 Charles Joseph Bonaparte, grandson of Jérôme Bonaparte (youngest brother of Emperor Napoleon I), United States cabinet member, and Signet Society's first president.
 Caspar Weinberger, former Secretary of Defense

Politics
 Chuck Schumer, U.S. Senator from New York
 Jay Rockefeller, U.S. Senator from West Virginia
 William Weld, former Massachusetts Governor
 Mark Penn, pollster, author
 Hamilton Fish Jr., Congressman

Controversy
One of the Signet Society's "gravest mistakes" was their rejection of cellist Yo-Yo Ma while he was an undergraduate at Harvard.

References
Notes

Sources
 Signet Society Website
 Documents relating to the Yale Elizabethan Club's organization and activities include correspondence, some written in Latin, with the Signet Society and are viewable through the online Yale Manuscripts and Archives Collection: 
 Birnbach, Lisa The Official Preppy Handbook, mentions Signet

Harvard University
1870 establishments in Massachusetts